Ellis William Roberts (1860–1930) was an English portrait painter. He began his career as a painter at the Minton factory in Stoke-on-Trent, then won a prize of thirty pounds. The prize enabled him to undertake two years of advanced training in South Kensington, London. There he was given a travelling studentship, and he set himself up as a painter. By the early 1900s he was well-known for his portraits of the beautiful women and girls of London society.

Two of his paintings are in the collection of the Potteries Museum & Art Gallery, Stoke-on-Trent, while several are in the possession of the National Trust.

References

1860 births
1930 deaths
19th-century English painters
English male painters
20th-century English painters
19th-century English male artists
20th-century English male artists